The Eminescu quadrangle (H-9) is one of fifteen quadrangles on Mercury. It runs from 216 to 288° longitude and from -25 to 25° latitude. Named after the Eminescu crater, it was mapped in detail for the first time after MESSENGER entered orbit around Mercury in 2011. It had not been mapped prior to that point because it was one of the six quadrangles that was not illuminated when Mariner 10 made its flybys in 1974 and 1975. These six quadrangles continued to be known by their albedo feature names, with this one known as the Solitudo Criophori quadrangle.

Derain quadrangle is to the west of Eminescu quadrangle, and Tolstoj quadrangle is to the east.  Hokusai quadrangle and Raditladi quadrangle are to the northwest and northeast, and Debussy quadrangle and Neruda quadrangle are to the southwest and southeast.

References